The 2002–03 Segunda División season saw 22 teams participate in the second flight Spanish league. The teams that promoted to La Liga were Real Murcia, Real Zaragoza and Albacete Balompié. The teams that relegated to Segunda División B were SD Compostela, Racing de Ferrol, Real Oviedo and CD Badajoz.

Teams

Teams by autonomous community

Final table

Results

Segunda División seasons
2
Spain